Qasim Umar Sokoto (died 5 February 2018) was a contributor to the Islamic Movement of Nigeria, the prayer leader and Islamic teacher in Sokoto, the Northern city of Nigeria.

On 18 July 2007, Shia community was persecuted in the region at by Nigerian security forces, following the death of Umaru Danmaishiyya, a popular Salafi cleric in Sokoto, who was well-known in Sokoto for his sermons against Shias. After that, Qasim Umar Sokoto was violently arrested along with hundreds of members of Shia community of Sokoto, but was set free by the courts in 2014 after a tortuous court case. Since then, He delivered many lectures in Islamic ceremonies and also peaceful rallies.

On Tuesday, 9 January 2018, during a demonstration of Shia people in Abuja, demanding the release of leader of Islamic Movement in Nigeria Ibrahim Zakzaky, Qasim was shot and injured by Nigerian Police, while two others were killed. After 26 days of treatment at a private facility in Kano, he died on 5 February 2018.

Following his death, the Islamic Movement issued a statement and announced that the Federal Government must bear responsibility for his death since he was shot by its agents while peacefully protesting the illegal detention of Sheikh Zakzaky – the leader of the Islamic Movement in Nigeria.

See also
Religion in Nigeria
Shia in Nigeria

References 

Converts to Shia Islam from Sunni Islam
Nigerian Shia clerics
Nigerian Shia Muslims
People from Zaria
People from Sokoto
Nigerian prisoners and detainees
Nigerian Muslim activists
2018 deaths
Year of birth missing